Adriana Taranto (born 1999) is an Australian football (soccer) player, who plays for Western United in the Australian A-League Women. She has also played for Galaxy United FC in the Victorian Women's Premier League. Taranto has represented Australia on the Australia women's national under-17 soccer team.

Playing career

Club

Melbourne Victory, 2015–
Taranto signed with Melbourne Victory in 2015.  She made her debut on 17 October 2015 in a match against Perth Glory. She made seven appearances for the team during the 2015–16 W-League season. Victory finished in ninth place during the regular season with a  record.  She returned to the squad for the 2016–17 W-League season.

International 
Taranto has represented Australia on the Australia women's national under-17 soccer team. In October 2014, she scored the game-opening goal in a match against Vietnam.

See also

References

Further reading
 Grainey, Timothy (2012), Beyond Bend It Like Beckham: The Global Phenomenon of Women's Soccer, University of Nebraska Press, 
 Stewart, Barbara (2012), Women's Soccer: The Passionate Game, Greystone Books,

External links
 

1999 births
Living people
Australian women's soccer players
Melbourne Victory FC (A-League Women) players
Western United FC (A-League Women) players
Women's association football midfielders